Murad Sergeyevich Ramazanov (born 10 March 1979) is a Russian former professional footballer.

External links
 

1979 births
Living people
Russian footballers
Russia under-21 international footballers
Association football midfielders
Russian Premier League players
Ukrainian Premier League players
Russian expatriate footballers
Expatriate footballers in Ukraine
FC Anzhi Makhachkala players
FC Kryvbas Kryvyi Rih players
FC Akhmat Grozny players
FC Rotor Volgograd players
FC Dynamo Bryansk players
FC Dynamo Makhachkala players
Sportspeople from Makhachkala